Starksia leucovitta, the whitesaddle blenny, is a species of labrisomid blenny only known to occur on the reefs around Navassa Island in the Caribbean Sea where it can be found from near the surface to a depth of .  This species can reach a length of  SL.

References

leucovitta
Fish described in 2003